Martin Tóth (born 13 October 1986) is a Slovak footballer who plays for AC Nitra as a centre-back.

Club career
He was signed by Spartak Trnava in July 2013 and made his debut for them against AS Trenčín on 21 July 2013.

Honours 
Spartak Trnava
 Fortuna Liga: 2017–18

References

External links

FC Nitra profile 

1986 births
Living people
Sportspeople from Nitra
Slovak footballers
Slovak expatriate footballers
Association football defenders
FC Nitra players
FC Slovan Liberec players
FC Spartak Trnava players
Zagłębie Sosnowiec players
FC ViOn Zlaté Moravce players
Slovak Super Liga players
Czech First League players
Ekstraklasa players
Expatriate footballers in the Czech Republic
Slovak expatriate sportspeople in the Czech Republic
Expatriate footballers in Poland
Slovak expatriate sportspeople in Poland